The Texas Six Pack was a group of six freshmen Republican congressmen from Texas who were elected during the 1984 Ronald Reagan landslide victory over Walter Mondale. With their victories the Texas congressional delegation shifted from a 21-6 Democratic advantage to only 17–10.

Five of the six new congressmen would go on to long and powerful careers in Washington. Beau Boulter, Mac Sweeney and Dick Armey upset three incumbent Democratic congressmen. Larry Combest won an open seat being vacated by retiring Democrat, later Republican Kent Hance, while Joe Barton and Tom DeLay won seats vacated by retiring Republicans Phil Gramm and Ron Paul, respectively.  For Sweeney, Combest, and Armey it was the first time their districts had ever elected a Republican to congress. Boulter relinquished his seat after two terms to wage an unsuccessful race against U.S. Senator Lloyd M. Bentsen, who ran the same year for Vice President of the United States.

References
The Almanac of American Politics 1986
Texas Monthly Dec 8, 1984

Republican Party members of the United States House of Representatives from Texas
1984 in Texas
1984 in American politics